En ledig dag is a song written by Bengt Sten and Matteo Chiosso. En ledig dag is the debut single released by Swedish singer Anni-Frid Lyngstad. The melody is based on another song titled "Weekend in Portofino", composed by Bruno de Filippi. This single was originally released as a non-album single in September 1967, but has been included on her compilation albums, Anni-Frid Lyngstad, "Tre kvart från nu" and "Frida 1967–1972".

Background

Dagen-H performance, recording session
After winning the Swedish talent competition called "New Faces" on 3 September 1967, Lyngstad performed the song live on TV, at the day of "Dagen H", where Sweden changed their traffic from left-hand road to their right-hand road. Lyngstad's recording took place at Europafilm Studio, Stockholm and recorded her vocals in a single take.

Legacy and impact
En ledig dag did not chart at the time of the release but is said to be circulated in Svensktoppen's charts, along with Lyngstad's continuous singles. She did not reach to her breakthrough until two years later, she appeared as a contestant for Melodifestivalen, singing "Härlig är vår jord" and toured with Charlie Norman's cabaret shows. Nonetheless, this single marked the turning point of Anni-Frid's life that her singing career would become successful in the future.

References

1967 songs
Anni-Frid Lyngstad songs